Epidermal growth factor receptor kinase substrate 8-like protein 1 is an enzyme that in humans is encoded by the EPS8L1 gene.

This gene encodes a protein that is related to epidermal growth factor receptor pathway substrate 8 (EPS8), a substrate for the epidermal growth factor receptor. The function of this protein is unknown. Several alternatively spliced transcript variants encoding different isoforms exist.

References

Further reading